Ralph Adrianus Joseph Gerardus Hamers (born 25 May 1966) is a Dutch businessman who is the UBS Group CEO.
He was the chief executive officer (CEO) of Dutch bank ING Group from October 2013 until June 2020.

Early life
Ralph Hamers was born on 25 May 1966. He has a master of science (MS) in business econometrics/operations research from Tilburg University.

Career
Hamers joined UBS in September 2020 as Group Executive Board member and became the UBS Group Chief Executive Officer (CEO) on 1 November 2020 replacing Sergio Ermotti.

Prior to UBS, Hamers spent 29 years at Dutch bank ING Group. 

Hamers joined ING in 1991 and was the CEO of ING between 1 October 2013 and June 2020. During his time as CEO, he steered the bank to profitability while repaying the Dutch government money it received during the financial crisis. Also under his leadership, ING invested heavily in its digital transformation, relying far more on its online offering and less on its branch network than most rivals, leading to the bank having one of the lowest cost-to-revenue ratios in Europe at the time.

In 2018, there was an uproar in the Netherlands following a proposal to raise Hamers' yearly salary from 1.6 million euro to 3 million euro. Following the uproar, the Board withdrew the offer, leaving his salary unchanged.

In December 2020, a Dutch court ordered the public prosecutor to open a probe into Hamers' involvement in his previous role as CEO of ING in the company's failure to comply with anti-money laundering regulations in 2018. Although the investigation was settled in 2018 with a €775 million fine paid by ING and, according to Bloomberg News, the public prosecutor stated that "it didn’t find enough evidence for criminal accusations against individuals at ING, including the top management", Hamers' investigation could continue into 2022 at the earliest.

Other activities
 Institute of International Finance (IIF), Member of the Board.

Personal life
Hamers is married, with twins.

References

External links

1966 births
Living people
Dutch bankers
Dutch chief executives in the finance industry
People from Simpelveld
Tilburg University alumni